Drosera lowriei is a perennial tuberous species in the genus Drosera that is endemic to Western Australia. It grows in a rosette about 3 cm in diameter. It is native to an area northwest of Esperance. It grows in loam soils in wet zones near granite outcrops. It is considered to be related to D. zonaria. It was first formally described by N. G. Marchant in 1992 and named in honour of Allen Lowrie.

See also 
List of Drosera species

References 

Carnivorous plants of Australia
Caryophyllales of Australia
lowriei
Eudicots of Western Australia
Plants described in 1992